The Mauritania national rugby union team represents Mauritania in international rugby union. Mauritania are a member of the International Rugby Board (IRB), and have yet to play in a Rugby World Cup tournament. The Mauritania national rugby team played their first ever international against Ghana in 2003, with Ghana winning the game 29 points to 8.

External links
 Mauritania on IRB.com
 Mauritania on rugbydata.com

African national rugby union teams
Rugby union in Mauritania
Rugby